Shams al-Dīn Muḥammad (before 1256 – ) was the 28th imam of the Nizari Isma'ili community. Little is known about his life. He was the first imam to rule after the destruction of the Nizari state by the Mongol Empire, and spent his life hiding his true identity.

Following his death, the line of succession split into two, the Qasim-Shahi line, which survives to this day in the Aga Khans, and the Muhammad-Shahi or Mu'mini line, which died out at the turn of the 19th century.

Life 
His life is obscure, as few details are recorded about him. He was the youngest son of Rukn al-Din Khurshah, the last ruler of Alamut Castle, the centre of a Nizari Ismaili state until it was captured by the Mongol Empire in November 1256. Nizari tradition records that he had been designated as heir by his father, and brought to safety in the last months before the Mongol siege of Alamut and his father's surrender. The rest of his family were executed by the Mongols, leaving Shams al-Din the only survivor. With his father's execution, sometime in late spring 1257, Shams al-Din automatically succeeded him as imam.

He spent the rest of his life in Adharbayjan, in or around Tabriz. He kept his identity hidden, instead assuming the guise of a Sufi mystic (a common practice among the Nizaris at the time) and embroiderer, whence he is known traditionally by the nickname Zarduz. In Nizari tradition, Shams al-Din is sometimes confused with the earlier mystic Shams Tabrizi (1185–1248). 

The fall of Alamut deprived the widespread Nizari movement of its centre, but Shams al-Din appears to have established contact with at least some Nizari groups. In his travelogue Safar-nama, the contemporary Ismaili poet Nizari Quhistani alludes to have seen him in person in 1280, calling him by the names Shams-i Din Shah Nimruz Ali and Shah Shams. During his imamate, the Nizari community managed to regroup in Rudbar in northern Persia and even temporarily reoccupied Alamut, but the Syrian Nizaris fell under the sway of the Mamluk Sultanate.

Death and succession disputes 
Shams al-Din died , inaugurating an obscure period in Nizari history that lasted until the late 15th century. The imams of the time are known as little less than names in lists of succession dating to much later periods, with few reliable dates or information about their lives. It is known however that after Shams al-Din's death, his oldest son, Ala al-Din Mu'min Shah, disputed the succession with the youngest, Qasim Shah. This split the Nizari imamate into two rival lines, the Qasim-Shahis, and the Mu'mini or Muhammad-Shahi line, although the schism itself is almost unmentioned in Nizari literature. The middle son, Kiya Shah, did not lay a similar claim.

The Mu'mini line, originally the more prominent of the two, died out in the late 18th century and has diminished today to a few thousand followers in Syria, while the Qasim-Shahi line has ended up representing most modern Isma'ilis, and is led today by the Aga Khans.

References

Sources 
 
 
 
 

13th-century Iranian people
14th-century Iranian people
13th-century Ismailis
14th-century Ismailis
13th-century Islamic religious leaders
14th-century Islamic religious leaders
13th-century births
1310 deaths
Iranian Ismailis
Nizari imams
Year of birth unknown
Year of death uncertain